Bence Ludánszki (born 25 October 1990) is a Hungarian football defender player who currently plays for Kaposvári. He made his professional debut in the 2012–13 Nemzeti Bajnokság I against Kaposvári Rákóczi FC.

Club statistics

Updated to games played as of 9 December 2014.

References
Profile

1990 births
Living people
Sportspeople from Debrecen
Hungarian footballers
Association football defenders
Debreceni VSC players
Nemzeti Bajnokság I players